Diego Sebastián Schwartzman (born 16 August 1992) is an Argentine professional tennis player. He has won four ATP singles titles and reached his career-high singles ranking of world  8 in October 2020. As a clay court specialist, his best results have been on this surface. He is noted for his high-quality return game.

When he reached the quarterfinals of the 2017 US Open, the  Schwartzman was the shortest Grand Slam quarterfinalist since the equally tall Jaime Yzaga at the 1994 US Open. Schwartzman said: "It’s not just for the big guys here."

Schwartzman reached his first Masters final at the 2020 Italian Open, defeating defending champion and world No. 2, Rafael Nadal, in straight sets, and Denis Shapovalov along the way. He lost to Novak Djokovic in the final. A month later, at the 2020 French Open, he defeated world No. 3 Dominic Thiem to reach his maiden Grand Slam semifinal, where he became the shortest man to reach a Grand Slam singles semifinal since the  Harold Solomon at the 1980 French Open.

Early life
Schwartzman is of Ashkenazi Jewish descent, and is the son of Ricardo Sebastián and Silvana Schwartzman. He was born and resides in Buenos Aires, Argentina. During the Holocaust, his Polish-Jewish maternal great-grandfather was put on a train to a Nazi concentration camp. The coupling that connected two of the train's cars broke, allowing his great-grandfather and others inside one car to escape. His great-grandfather brought his family by boat from Germany to Argentina. His father's ancestors emigrated from Russia to Argentina by boat.

Growing up, Schwartzman played tennis at Club Náutico Hacoaj, a Jewish-Argentine sports club in Buenos Aires that was established by and for Jews who were not allowed to join other sports clubs in the city in the early 20th century. At junior tournaments, Schwartzman often faced antisemitic catcalls. On the ATP Tour, he has endured less antisemitism, but at the 2017 US Open, a spectator shouted, "Jewish people are not allowed here" in the direction of Schwartzman.

Schwartzman's family owned a successful clothing and jewelry company.  However, around the time Schwartzman was born, the family became quite poor because of the Argentine great depression. To afford the expenses of tennis, Schwartzman and his mother would sell bracelets at his junior tennis tournaments.

Schwartzman has two brothers (one a computer programmer, the other a travel agent) and a sister (a lawyer). Schwartzman's nickname is El Peque (an abbreviation of the word "pequeño", meaning "Shorty" in Spanish).

Career

Junior career
Schwartzman did not have an illustrious junior career and peaked at an ITF junior ranking of No. 217. At age 13, he began traveling across South America to play in junior tournaments. He saw success at that level and began receiving funding to pay for travel, equipment, and coaching expenses. The only junior Grand Slam he played in was the 2010 US Open, where he lost in the first round of qualifying.

2010–13
In 2010, at the age of 17, he won the Bolivia F3 Futures (CL), and in 2011 he won the Chile F14 Futures (CL). In 2012, Schwartzman won titles at the Peru F2 Futures (CL), Argentina F11 Futures (CL), Argentina F14 Futures (CL), Argentina F20 Futures (CL), Argentina F21 Futures (CL), Argentina F22 Futures (CL), and Buenos Aires Challenger (CL). At the 2013 Australian Open, he lost in the final round of qualifying.

2014: Four Challenger titles & ATP Challenger Tour Finals champion
Schwartzman made his first appearance in the main draw of a Grand Slam event at the French Open; he came through qualifying before making it to the second round, where he lost to Roger Federer. He lost in the first round of the US Open to Novak Djokovic.

He won four titles in the ATP Challenger Tour—at Aix-en-Provence, Prague, Campinas, and San Juan. In the Challenger Tour Finals, he won over João Souza, Simone Bolelli, and Guilherme Clezar to claim the title. At the end of the season, Schwartzman was ranked No. 61 worldwide.

2015: Davis Cup semifinals

Schwartzman's best result of the season came at the Istanbul Open, where he reached the semifinals, beating former top-ten player Jürgen Melzer along the way. He faced tennis legend Roger Federer in the semifinals. Schwartzman won the first set decisively before ultimately falling 7–5 in the final set. He was also part of the Argentine Davis Cup Team, which reached the semifinals in 2015.

2016: First ATP title

Schwartzman won his first-ever singles title at the Istanbul Open—an outdoor 250 clay court event. He impressively defeated established top player Grigor Dimitrov in the final, coming back to win 6–0 in the final set after losing the first set in a tie-break. Later, Dimitrov apologized for his behavior during the match after he smashed three rackets, which ultimately led to a warning, a point penalty, and another point penalty. The second and final point penalty came with Dimitrov down 5–0 and gave the game, set, and match to Schwartzman.

In October, Schwartzman reached his second final at the 250 level in Antwerp. He lost to Richard Gasquet, 6–7, 1–6. In 2016, he led all ATP players in the percentage of break points converted, at 46.6%.

2017: US Open quarterfinals

Schwartzman reached the third round at the French Open, where he faced Novak Djokovic. He had a 2–1 set lead, but eventually, Djokovic won in five sets.

In the Canadian Open, the 25-year-old saved four match points to pull off a remarkable 4–6, 7–6, 7–5 upset of No. 3 seed Dominic Thiem, his first-ever win over a top-10 player. As of mid-August 2017, Schwartzman was leading the ATP Tour in winning percentage in return games at 36 percent (192/532), with Nadal in second place and Djokovic in fourth place.

On 1 September, Schwartzman upset world No. 7 and 5th seed, Marin Cilic in the third round of the US Open to equal the biggest win of his career. On 3 September, he beat world No. 20 and 16th seed, Lucas Pouille, in the fourth round to reach his first career major quarterfinal. In the quarterfinals, he lost to Pablo Carreño Busta. 

Schwartzman's 2017 season proved to be the best of his career to that point. He finished the year ranked world No. 25; in addition to making his first major quarterfinal, he also made two quarterfinals at the Masters 1000 level. He won 39 singles matches and earned $1,536,000 over the course of the season, easily besting his previous records of 17 match wins and $441,000 in the 2016 season. In 2017, he led all ATP players in the percentage of second serve return points won (56.1%) and percentage of return games won (34.8%) while coming in third behind Andy Murray and Rafael Nadal in the percentage of first serve return points won (34.3%). Finally, he scored his first win over a top-10 player, and then just two weeks later, he racked up a second top-10 win.

2018: Second ATP title, top-15 ranking & second Grand Slam quarterfinal
In his first 17 Grand Slam tournaments, Schwartzman had only reached the third round once. However, at the 2018 Australian Open, he advanced to the fourth round, where he played world No. 1, Rafael Nadal. For the first time in his career, Schwartzman made the second week at a major for the second consecutive time, following his quarterfinal showing at the 2017 US Open. Despite going into the match with an 0-3 head-to-head record, 0–7 in sets, Schwartzman took the second-set tiebreak 7-4 before eventually going down in four sets. By virtue of his performance, he reached a new career-high singles ranking of No. 24 on 29 January 2018.

He then went on to capture the title at the Rio Open, an ATP 500-level clay tournament, defeating Fernando Verdasco 6–2, 6–3. The Rio Open marked the biggest title of Schwartzman's career thus far. He reached a new career-high singles ranking of No. 15 on 2 April 2018 and was the first Jewish male player to break into the singles top 20 since Nicolás Massú was ninth in 2004. At the French Open, Schwartzman made it into his second Grand Slam quarterfinal. He didn't drop a set on his run to the fourth round, where he faced sixth seed and world No. 7, Kevin Anderson, and won in just under four hours after coming back from two sets to love down for the first time in his career. Questioned by reporters as to how he defeated the 6’ 8″ Anderson, he replied: "Did you read David and Goliath?" In the quarterfinals, he took the first set from Rafael Nadal, but it started raining, and the match was postponed to the next day where Nadal won the following three sets. His quarterfinal showing marked his third consecutive Grand Slam tournament, where he made it to the second week of competition.

Schwartzman participated in only two grass court events in 2018; they included the Eastbourne International and Wimbledon. Although Schwartzman was the No. 1 seed, he fell in three sets in the first round to Mirza Bašić. At Wimbledon, Schwartzman scored his first career grass-court win by defeating Mirza Bašić in straight sets before falling in the second round to Jiří Veselý.

Schwartzman reached the quarterfinals of the 2018 German Open but fell to eventual finalist Leonardo Mayer in three sets. In 2018 he was second to Nadal among all ATP players in the percentage of second-serve return points won (55.8%) and percentage of return games won (30.7%).

2019: Third ATP title, first Masters final & Major semifinal in doubles

At the Australian Open, Schwartzman defeated Rudolf Molleker in four sets and American Denis Kudla in a five-set thriller. He was knocked out in the third round by former Wimbledon finalist, Tomáš Berdych.

Schwartzman then competed in the Cordoba Open, making the quarterfinals. He went on to make the finals at the Argentina Open, an ATP 250-level clay tournament. On his way to the finals, Schwartzman defeated world No. 8, Dominic Thiem, 2–6, 6–4, 7–6 but he lost in straight sets to Marco Cecchinato in the finals.
Schwartzman was unable to defend his title at the Rio Open, retiring in the second set with a right leg injury in the first round.

At the 2019 Mutua Madrid Open as an unseeded pair, Schwartzman reached his first Masters 1000 final in doubles partnering Dominic Thiem, where they lost to Jean-Julien Rojer and Horia Tecău. He defeated world No. 6, Kei Nishikori, 6–4, 6–2 in the quarterfinals of the Italian Open before being defeated by Djokovic in three sets.

At the 2019 French Open partnering compatriot Guido Pella also as an unseeded pair, he reached his first Grand Slam doubles semifinal losing to eventual champions the German pair of Kevin Krawietz and Andreas Mies. In singles, he lost to another fellow Argentine Leonardo Mayer in the second round.
 
Schwartzman then captured the title at the 2019 Los Cabos Open, defeating Taylor Fritz in the final, 7–6(8–6), 6–3. It marked his first-ever title at a hard-court tournament and third ATP title.

At the US Open, Schwartzman upset world No. 6, Alexander Zverev, in four sets in the fourth round, for his sixth career victory against a top-10 opponent. In the quarter-finals he fell to eventual champion Rafael Nadal.

In Vienna at the Erste Bank Open in October, Schwartzman beat world No. 9, Karen Khachanov of Russia, in straight sets and world No. 14, Gael Monfils. Dominic Thiem defeated him in the final.

In 2019, as he had done in 2017, Schwartzman led all ATP players in the percentage of second-serve return points won (56.1%). For the years 2015–19, of all match-winning tennis players he led in winning percentage against second serves (60%), and against first serves (37.9%).  Career-wise, he was fourth among active players in return games won (31.1%), behind only Nadal (33.5%), Djokovic (32%), and Andy Murray (31.7%).

2020: First Masters final, French Open semifinal, top 10 debut, and ATP Finals

At the Australian Open, Schwartzman reached the fourth round without dropping a set but was defeated by the eventual champion, Novak Djokovic. He was seeded ninth in the men's singles draw at the US Open but lost in a first-round five-setter to the unseeded British player Cameron Norrie.

At the Italian Open, Schwartzman defeated nine-time champion and world No. 2, Rafael Nadal, in straight sets in the quarterfinals, his first victory against Nadal.  Schwartzman said: "It was my best match ever." He went on to defeat Denis Shapovalov to reach the final against Djokovic, his first ATP Masters 1000 final, becoming the shortest player to reach a Masters final. There, he lost in two tight sets despite being a double break up in the first set.

At the French Open, Schwartzman defeated world No. 3 Dominic Thiem in the quarterfinals in a five-set match that took five hours and eight minutes to complete. It was his ninth career win over a top-10 player. In a rematch of the Italian Open quarterfinals, he was defeated by Nadal in straight sets in Schwartzman's first major semifinals, where he became the shortest man to reach a Grand Slam singles semi-final since  Harold Solomon at the 1980 French Open.

The following week Schwartzman was ranked No. 8 in the world, his first time ranked in the top 10 singles players. He was the shortest player in the top 10 since Harold Solomon in 1981.

His first tournament as a top 10 player was at the 2020 Bett1Hulks Championship. He defeated Alejandro Davidovich Fokina in the quarterfinals and Félix Auger-Aliassime in the semifinals but was defeated in the final by Alexander Zverev. At the Paris Masters, Schwartzman beat Richard Gasquet and Alejandro Davidovich Fokina before losing to Daniil Medvedev in the quarterfinals.

Schwartzman qualified for the 2020 ATP Finals as one of the top 8. In his debut appearance, he was eliminated in the round-robin stage with a straight-set loss to Novak Djokovic and a three-set loss to Alexander Zverev. As a result of his successful season and entrance into the ATP top 10, Schwartzman was awarded the Olimpia Award, which is given to the most important Argentinian sportsperson of the year.

2021: Fourth ATP title, French Open quarterfinal

Schwartzman reached the third round of the Australian Open but was defeated by qualifier Aslan Karatsev in a rare matchup between two Jewish tennis players. Karatsev went on to reach the semifinals of the tournament. He was the top seed at the Córdoba Open, but was defeated in the quarterfinals by Albert Ramos Viñolas in three sets.

In his hometown tournament, the Argentina Open, Schwartzman won his first tournament since 2019. In the semifinals, he defeated Miomir Kecmanović and in the final Francisco Cerúndolo. He did not drop a set in the entire tournament.

Seeded 10th at the 2021 French Open, Schwartzman reached the quarterfinals without dropping a set but was defeated by Rafael Nadal in a thrilling four-set match. Schwartzman was the eight seed in the 2020 Olympics, which were held in 2021 because of the COVID-19 pandemic. He easily defeated Juan Pablo Varillas and Tomáš Macháč but lost in 3 sets in an upset to Karen Khachanov.

At the 2021 US Open, Schwartzman reached the fourth round defeating Ričardas Berankis, Kevin Anderson, and Alex Molcan without dropping a set. However, in the fourth round, he was upset by qualifier Botic van de Zandschulp in a five-set, four-hour, and 19-minute match.

At 2021 Indian Wells, Schwartzman reached the quarterfinals, beating Maxime Cressy, Dan Evans and Casper Ruud before being defeated by Cameron Norrie in straight sets. A week later, he reached the final at the European Open, highlighted by a win over former No. 1 Andy Murray in the first career matchup between the two. Schwartzman was defeated in the championship match by Jannik Sinner. He continued his success in the fall swing of the season by reaching the quarterfinals at the 2021 Erste Bank Open with wins over Fabio Fognini and Gael Monfils.

2022: Two Golden Swing finals, Masters singles quarterfinal & doubles final

Schwartzman started the 2022 season strong with a convincing 6–1, 6–2 win over Nikoloz Basilashvili and a three-set win over world No. 4 Stefanos Tsitsipas at the 2022 ATP Cup. In a shocking upset, Schwartzman lost in the second round of the Australian Open to Australian Christopher O'Connell, who was ranked No. 175 in the world at the time.

Schwartzman saw early success in the season during the Golden Swing, a series of four tennis tournaments in South America. Entering the 2022 Córdoba Open as the top seed, Schwartzman was favored to win the tournament held in his home country. Schwartzman defeated Juan Pablo Ficovich and Daniel Elahi Galán to reach the semifinals, where he lost to Alejandro Tabilo. The following week Schwartzman entered the Argentina Open as the tournament's defending champion and defeated Jaume Munar, Francisco Cerúndolo and Lorenzo Sonego to reach the final. He lost in three sets to the tournament's top seed and world No. 8 Casper Ruud in the final. The next week, Schwartzman continued his success in South America by reaching the final at the Rio Open an ATP 500 tournament. However, he lost in the championship match to Carlos Alcaraz in straight sets.

At the 2022 Monte-Carlo Masters, an ATP 1000 level tournament, which was Schwartzman's first tournament of the spring clay season, he reached the quarterfinals. His run to the quarterfinals included wins over Karen Khachanov, Márton Fucsovics, and Lorenzo Musetti. In a tight three-set match, Schwartzman lost to Tsitsipas in the quarterfinals. Schwartzman continued his winning ways during the European clay swing of the season by reaching the quarterfinals of the 2022 Barcelona Open, an ATP 500 event, where he defeated world No. 9 Félix Auger-Aliassime in three sets before falling to Pablo Carreño Busta in the semifinals. At the 2022 Italian Open, Schwartzman partnered with John Isner as an unseeded pair and defeated Andrey Golubev and Máximo González in the semifinal. They were defeated in the final by the Croatian duo of Nikola Mektić and Mate Pavić.

Schwartzman entered the 2022 French Open as the #15 seed. He defeated Andrey Kuznetsov, Jaume Munar, and #18 seed Grigor Dimitrov to reach the fourth round. There he was defeated by #1 seed and defending champion Novak Djokovic.

Schwartzman, who has struggled throughout his career on the grass courts, lost in the second round of the 2022 Eastbourne International and the first round at the 2022 Queen's Club Championships. At the 2022 Wimbledon Championships, where he was the #12 seed, Schwartzman defeated Stefan Kozlov but lost in the second round to Liam Broady in five sets. 

Schwartzman reached the quarterfinals in the summer clay season at the Swedish Open. During the US Open Series, Schwartzman defeated Alejandro Davidovich Fokina and reached the second round of the National Bank Open. The following week, at the Cincinnati Open, he defeated Alex Molčan and Aslan Karatsev before falling to Stefanos Tsitsipas in the third round. At the 2022 US Open, Schwartzman was seeded No.14 and defeated Jack Sock and Alexei Popyrin to reach the third round but was defeated by Frances Tiafoe.

Playing style 
Schwartzman is a baseline player with solid groundstrokes on both wings and the ability to counterpunch and go on the offensive. He is known for the clean hitting off both his forehand and backhand and can take the ball on the rise and hit it with depth and pace. Analysts consider that he plays well on the defensive due to his speed and ability to hit winners from defensive positions far out of the court. His speed also allows him to retrieve drop shots and hit passing shots easily.

Schwartzman has a consistent, though not outstanding, serve and arguably plays better on the return than on serve. In 2017, he statistically led the ATP on return games, and second-serve points won. He also possesses solid volleys and prefers the drop volley, though they are not a major weapon in his game.

Schwartzman's speed and powerful baseline game have resulted in most of his success coming on clay rather than hard courts or grass. However, in the past few years, he has attempted to add more variety to his game, resulting in breakthroughs, particularly on grass, scoring his first-ever win on grass only in 2018.

Career statistics

Grand Slam tournament performance timeline

Current through the 2023 Australian Open.

Personal life 
Schwartzman's grandparents fled from Europe to escape the Holocaust. Schwartzman is in a relationship with Eugenia De Martino, a fashion model from Argentina.

See also
List of notable Jewish tennis players

References

External links
 
 
 
  
 

1992 births
Living people
Argentine male tennis players
Jewish tennis players
Jewish Argentine sportspeople
Tennis players from Buenos Aires
Argentine Ashkenazi Jews
Argentine people of German-Jewish descent
Argentine people of Polish-Jewish descent
Argentine people of Russian descent
Competitors at the 2010 South American Games
South American Games bronze medalists for Argentina
South American Games medalists in tennis
Olympic tennis players of Argentina
Tennis players at the 2020 Summer Olympics